Slaughter's Big Rip-Off is a 1973 blaxploitation film directed by Gordon Douglas and written by Charles Eric Johnson. The film stars Jim Brown, Ed McMahon, Don Stroud, Brock Peters, Gloria Hendry and Dick Anthony Williams. The film was released on August 31, 1973, by American International Pictures. It is the sequel to the 1972 film Slaughter.

Plot
Slaughter (Jim Brown), a fierce Vietnam veteran and ex-Green Beret, had avenged the death of his parents by killing the gangster who was responsible for their death in Mexico. He is now relocated in Los Angeles, California, a place that Slaughter sought to escape the past events and begin his attempt to have a tranquil life.

Slaughter goes to a friend's house for a lavish outdoor picnic and celebration. Meanwhile, a new crime boss, Duncan (Ed McMahon), is now after Slaughter, for having killed ex Mafia boss Dominic Hoffo earlier. An old World War I biplane is seen flying by the outdoor celebration and then opening fire on the guests at the picnic. It results in the graphic death by headshot of Slaughter's friend, which reignites the old spark of fury and rage that Slaughter had when told of the death of his parents.

Duncan's first assassination attempt in essence is a failure and only succeeds in waking a sleeping beast. Duncan hires a new hit-man named Kirk (Don Stroud) to bring Slaughter to his demise. Rather than being in protective custody under the supervision of Duncan's crooked cops, Slaughter remains on the streets.

Slaughter's new friend is a police official, Det. Reynolds, who warns that his life is in peril. Slaughter also has a girlfriend, Marcia (Gloria Hendry), who is also being targeted by the mob, under Duncan's orders, to further provoke Slaughter.

Slaughter makes an agreement with Reynolds to obtain confidential documents of the Mafia's operations. He coaxes a drug-addicted pimp to assist him in breaking into Duncan's safe house and successfully escape with the documents. After gun fights, Slaughter and his pimp sidekick kill several of Duncan's guards and associates. In response, Duncan sends Kirk to kidnap Slaughter's girlfriend, a fatal mistake on Duncan's part.

Cast
Jim Brown as Slaughter
Ed McMahon as Duncan
Don Stroud as Kirk
Brock Peters as Reynolds
Gloria Hendry as Marcia
Dick Anthony Williams as Joe Creole
Art Metrano as Mario Burtoli
Judith Brown as Norja
Jacquliene Giroux as Mrs. Duncan
Eddie Lo Russo as Arnie
Russ McGinn as Harvey Parker
Hoke Howell as Jimmy Parker
Chuck Hicks as Lyle Parker
Russ Marin as Crowder
Nick Benedict as Gains

Soundtrack

The album for Slaughter's Big Rip-Off and the songs associated with it were composed by James Brown.

 "Slaughter's Theme Song" (4:01)
 "Tryin' to Get Over" (2:28)
 "Transmorgrapfication" (2:00)
 "Happy for the Poor" (2:45)
 "Brother Rapp" (3:04)
 "Big Strong" (3:19)
 "Really, Really, Really" (1:51)
 "Sexy, Sexy, Sexy" (3:11)
 "To My Brother" (2:12)
 "How Long Can I Keep Up" (5:31)
 "People Get Up and Drive Your Funky Soul" (3:43)
 "King Slaughter" (2:46)
 "Straight Ahead" (2:45)

See also
List of American films of 1973

References

External links

American International Pictures films
Films directed by Gordon Douglas
Blaxploitation films
1970s English-language films